Samuel Sadler House is a historic home located at Sandy Creek in Oswego County, New York.  It was built about 1870 and is a 2-story, red brick Italianate-style structure consisting of a 2-story, three-bay main block and -story, four-bay side wing and 1-story rear wing.  Also on the property is a contemporary carriage house.

It was listed on the National Register of Historic Places in 1988.

References

Houses on the National Register of Historic Places in New York (state)
Italianate architecture in New York (state)
Houses completed in 1870
Houses in Oswego County, New York
National Register of Historic Places in Oswego County, New York